Ropoloceras is an extinct ancyloceratin genus included in the family Crioceratitidae, subclass Ammonoidea, from the Upper Hauterivian. Fossils belonging to this genera were found on localities that are now in Switzerland, France and Spain.

References

Ammonitida genera
Crioceratitidae
Fossils of France
Fossils of Switzerland
Fossils of Spain
Hauterivian life
Early Cretaceous ammonites of Europe